The total population of China's Uzbeks in 2021 is 12,742, scattered in Yining, Shache, Urumqi, Tacheng and other places in Xinjiang. Most of them live in urban areas and a few in rural areas. Danangou Uzbek Township is the only Uzbek Township in China. The Uzbeks in southern Xinjiang use Uyghur language because they live together with the Uyghurs for a long time, and the Uzbeks in the pastoral areas of northern Xinjiang use Kazakh language.

References

Ethnic groups officially recognized by China